Below are the results of the FIS Alpine World Ski Championships 2007 men's super-g race, which took place on 6 February 2007.

Results

References 

Men's Super-G